St. George Hotel or St. George's Hotel may refer to:

 St. George Hotel (Volcano, California), listed on the NRHP in California
 Hotel St. George, Brooklyn, New York
 St. George's Hotel, Hull, England
 St. George's Hotel, London, England
 St. George Hotel, Wellington, New Zealand
 St. Georges Hotel, Beirut, Lebanon
 Hotel Saint-George, Algiers, Algeria